Dedoplistskaro or Dedoplistsqaro (literally: Queen's spring) is a town in Kakheti, Georgia with the population of 5,940. The town is located in the Shiraki Plain, eastern Georgia, and functions as a municipality of the eponymous district. The majority of the inhabitants are ethnic Azeris.

History 
The locale is first mentioned in the medieval annals as a military post established by King David IV of Georgia (r. 1089–1125). Tradition relates its name, literally meaning "the Queen’s spring" to Queen Tamar (r. 1184–1213). After the annexation of Georgia, Russians established a military fort in 1803 to fend off the area being attacked by the Dagestani rebels and renamed the village into Tsarskie Kolodtsy, that is "the royal wells".

In 1869, the German entrepreneurs Carl Heinrich von Siemens and Ernst Werner von Siemens established an oil refinery near the village which functioned until the mid-1870s.

The village retained its military installations and a large garrison during Georgia's brief independence from 1918 to 1921. It was seized by the invading Soviet Russian forces after hours of heavy fighting with Georgian troops on February 18, 1921. The Russian commander Pyotr Kuryshko died in this battle.

The Soviet government changed the name into Tsiteltskaro (წითელწყარო; "Red Spring") and granted the settlement a town's status in 1963. In 1991, the historical name of Dedoplis Tskaro was restored. Ruins of the medieval fortress of Khornabuji lie near the town. The Vashlovani State Reserve is also located within the Dedoplis Tskaro district.

See also
 Kakheti

References 

Cities and towns in Kakheti
Tiflis Governorate